Vespula flavopilosa, also known as the downy yellowjacket, is a species of yellowjacket found in North America.

References

Further reading

 

Vespidae